Akhmetka (Äxmät) is a rural locality (a village) in Tabynsky Selsoviet, Gafuriysky District, Bashkortostan, Russia. The population was 53 as of 2010. There are 2 streets.

Geography 
Akhmetka is located 22 km north of Krasnousolsky (the district's administrative centre) by road. Pavlovka is the nearest rural locality.

References 

Rural localities in Gafuriysky District